Minuscule 800 (in the Gregory-Aland numbering), A407 (von Soden), is a Greek minuscule manuscript of the New Testament written on parchment. Palaeographically it has been assigned to the 12th century. The manuscript is lacunose.

Description 
The codex contains the text of the four Gospels, on 217 parchment leaves (size ), with some lacunae (John 13:29-18:23; 19:24-21:25). The biblical text is surrounded by catenae.
The biblical text is written in 21 lines per page, the text of the commentary in 50 lines per page.

There is also another division according to the smaller Ammonian Sections (in Mark 234 sections, the last section in 16:9), with references to the Eusebian Canons.

Subscriptions were added by a later hand.

Text 
Aland the Greek text of the codex did not placed in any Category V.

It was not examined according to the Claremont Profile Method.

It lacks the Pericope Adulterae (John 7:53-8:11).

History 
According to C. R. Gregory the manuscript was written in the 12th century. The manuscript is currently dated by the INTF to the 12th century.

It was added to the list of New Testament manuscripts by Gregory (800). Gregory saw the manuscript in 1886.

The manuscript is now housed at the National Library of Greece (65) in Athens.

See also 

 List of New Testament minuscules
 Biblical manuscript
 Textual criticism
 Minuscule 799

References

Further reading 

 

Greek New Testament minuscules
12th-century biblical manuscripts
Manuscripts of the National Library of Greece